Arthur John Bates (18 June 1852 – 13 February 1925) was an English cricketer. Bates was a right-handed batsman who bowled right-arm slow. He was born at Nottingham, Nottinghamshire.

Bates made two first-class appearances for Nottinghamshire in 1878, against Derbyshire at Trent Bridge and Yorkshire at Bramall Lane, scoring just 5 runs in his two matches.

He died at Lenton, Nottinghamshire on 13 February 1925.

References

External links
Arthur Bates at ESPNcricinfo
Arthur Bates at CricketArchive

1852 births
1925 deaths
Cricketers from Nottingham
English cricketers
Nottinghamshire cricketers